Union County is a county in the Commonwealth of Pennsylvania. As of the 2020 census, the population was 42,681. Its county seat is Lewisburg. The county was created on March 22, 1813, from part of Northumberland County. Its name is an allusion to the federal Union. Mifflinburg was established by legislation as the first county seat until it was moved to New Berlin in 1815. Lewisburg became county seat in 1855 and has remained so since. Union County comprises the Lewisburg, PA Micropolitan Statistical Area, which is also included in the Bloomsburg-Berwick-Sunbury, PA Combined Statistical Area.

Geography
It is the fourth-smallest county in Pennsylvania by area. Union has a humid continental climate (Dfa/Dfb) and average temperatures in Lewisburg range from 27.2 °F in January to 72.7 °F in July, while in Hartleton they range from 26.4 °F in January to 72.1 °F in July.

Adjacent counties
Lycoming County (north)
Northumberland County (east)
Snyder County (south)
Mifflin County (southwest)
Centre County (west)
Clinton County (northwest)

State protected areas
R. B. Winter State Park
Sand Bridge State Park
Shikellamy State Park's overlook is in Union County. The marina is across the Susquehanna River in Northumberland County.

Major highways

Demographics

As of the census of 2000, there were 41,624 people, 13,178 households, and 9,211 families residing in the county. The population density was 131 people per square mile (51/km2). There were 14,684 housing units at an average density of 46 per square mile (18/km2). The racial makeup of the county was 90.08% White, 6.91% Black or African American, 0.16% Native American, 1.06% Asian, 0.04% Pacific Islander, 0.37% from other races, and 1.37% from two or more races. 3.90% of the population were Hispanic or Latino of any race. 41.2% were of German, 13.9% American, 6.5% Irish, 5.9% English and 5.3% Italian ancestry. 90.4% spoke English, 3.7% Spanish, 2.0% Pennsylvania Dutch and 1.2% German as their first language.

There were 13,178 households, out of which 31.10% had children under the age of 18 living with them, 59.90% were married couples living together, 6.90% had a female householder with no husband present, and 30.10% were non-families. 25.30% of all households were made up of individuals, and 11.80% had someone living alone who was 65 years of age or older. The average household size was 2.50 and the average family size was 3.00.

In the county, the population was spread out, with 20.10% under the age of 18, 13.90% from 18 to 24, 30.90% from 25 to 44, 21.70% from 45 to 64, and 13.40% who were 65 years of age or older. The median age was 36 years. For every 100 females there were 123.90 males. For every 100 females age 18 and over, there were 128.50 males.

2020 Census

Micropolitan Statistical Area

The United States Office of Management and Budget has designated Union County as the Lewisburg, PA Micropolitan Statistical Area (µSA). As of the 2010 census the micropolitan area ranked 12th most populous in the State of Pennsylvania and the 263rd most populous in the United States with a population of 44,947. Union County is also a part of the Bloomsburg–Berwick–Sunbury, PA Combined Statistical Area (CSA), which combines the populations of Union County, as well as Columbia, Montour, Northumberland and Snyder Counties in Pennsylvania. The Combined Statistical Area ranked 8th in the State of Pennsylvania and 115th most populous in the United States with a population of 264,739.

Government

County Commissioners
Preston Boop (R)
Jeff Reber (R)
Stacy Richards (D)

State government
David H. Rowe – State Representative, Pennsylvania House of Representatives, District 85
Garth D. Everett – State Representative, Pennsylvania House of Representatives, District 84
Gene Yaw – State Senator, Pennsylvania Senate, District 23

Federal level
 Fred Keller, Republican, Pennsylvania's 12th Congressional District in 2019 after redistricting.
 John Fetterman, US Senator
 Bob Casey, Jr., US Senator

Politics

|}

In presidential elections, Union County has voted for Democratic candidates less than almost any county in the nation. Andrew Jackson was the last Democratic Party candidate to win the county, in 1828. The county has been solidly Republican in Presidential elections since John C. Frémont's win against James Buchanan in 1856. The only exception was William Howard Taft's loss to Theodore Roosevelt of the Bull Moose (Progressive) Party – which had splintered from the Republican Party – in 1912. The county has also voted for Republican Senators, State Treasurers, and State Auditors for decades. Robert P. Casey is the only Democratic gubernatorial candidate to win the county in the last fifty years. The county seat of Lewisburg is heavily Democratic, having given Joe Biden over 70% of its vote in 2020. However, the rest of the county is overwhelmingly Republican.

Education

Public school districts
Lewisburg Area School District
Lewisburg Area High School
Mifflinburg Area School District
Mifflinburg Area High School
Milton Area School District (also in Northumberland County)
Milton Area High School
Warrior Run School District (also in Montour and Northumberland Counties)
Warrior Run High School

Vocational school
SUN Area Technical Institute - New Berlin

Higher education
Bucknell University - Lewisburg

Private schools
Beaver Run School - Lewisburg
Bridgeville Parochial School - Mifflinburg
Buffalo Creek Parochial School - Mifflinburg
Calvary Holiness Academy - Millmont
Camp Mount Luther - Mifflinburg
County Line Amish School - Winfield
East End Parochial School - Lewisburg
Green Grove School - Mifflinburg
Hartleton Mennonite School - Millmont
Kumon Math and Learning of Lewisburg
Limestone Valley Parochial School - Mifflinburg
Morningstar Mennonite School - Mifflinburg
Mountain Laurel School
Mountain View Parochial School
Norbrld Area Head Start Central Susquehanna Intermediate Unit 16
Ridge View Parochial School
Shady Grove Christian School
Snyder Union Mifflin Child Development - Mifflinburg
Sunnyside School - Millmont
Union Co ARC Child Development Center - Lewisburg
Union Co CC and Learning Center - Lewisburg
White Springs School - Mifflinburg

Communities

Under Pennsylvania law, there are four types of incorporated municipalities: cities, boroughs, townships, and, in most cases, towns. The following boroughs and townships are located in Union County:

Boroughs
Hartleton
Lewisburg (county seat)
Mifflinburg
New Berlin

Townships

Buffalo
East Buffalo
Gregg
Hartley
Kelly
Lewis
Limestone
Union
West Buffalo
White Deer

Census-designated places
Census-designated places are geographical areas designated by the U.S. Census Bureau for the purposes of compiling demographic data. They are not actual jurisdictions under Pennsylvania law. Other unincorporated communities, such as villages, may be listed here as well.

Allenwood
Laurelton
Linntown
New Columbia
Vicksburg
West Milton
Winfield

Population ranking
The population ranking of the following table is based on the 2010 census of Union County.

† county seat

See also
National Register of Historic Places listings in Union County, Pennsylvania

References

External links

Pennsylvania Department of Transportation, Bureau of Planning and Research, Geographic Information Division, "2005 General Highway Map of Union and Snyder Counties". Note: shows boroughs, townships, roads, villages, some streams. URL accessed on April 5, 2006.
Buffalo Creek Watershed Alliance
Snyder, Charles M. Union County, Pennsylvania: A Celebration of History, Penn State Press, 2001 

 
1813 establishments in Pennsylvania
Populated places established in 1813
Counties of Appalachia